Cliffs Shaft Mine Museum
Hibernia mines
Hull–Rust–Mahoning Open Pit Iron Mine
Iron Mountain (Utah)
Iron Mountain District
Iron Mountain Mine
Jackson Mine
Minorca Mine
Milford Mine
Mountain Iron Mine
Pioneer Mine
Pyne Mine
Rouchleau Mine
Sloss Mines
Soudan Underground Mine State Park
Wenonah, Alabama

See also
Iron mining in the United States

Iron